Rocksprings is a town in Edwards County, Texas, in the United States. As of the 2010 census, the town population was 1,182, down from 1,285 at the 2000 census. It is the county seat of Edwards County. The town received its name from natural springs associated with the porous limestone rocks in the area.

History
J. R. Sweeten sited Rocksprings in 1891 because of the springs nearby. Also in 1891, the town acquired a post office and was made county seat. The original courthouse built in the town burned in 1897. By 1914, Rocksprings had a population around 500.

During the early 1900s, hostilities between Anglos and Mexicans along the "Brown Belt" were common.  In Rocksprings, Antonio Rodriguez, a twenty-year-old Mexican, was burned at the stake by a white mob for allegedly killing a white woman, Effie Greer Henderson.  This event was widely publicized and protests against the treatment of Mexicans in the U.S. erupted within the interior of Mexico, namely in Guadalajara and Mexico City. This was part of a series of racist killings known as La Matanza.

On April 12, 1927, the town was hit by an F5 tornado that destroyed 235 of the 247 buildings in the town. The tornado killed 72 townspeople and injured 205, almost a third of the population at the time.

Geography

Rocksprings is located northeast of the center of Edwards County at  (30.016161, –100.209023). Rocksprings sits on top of the Edwards Plateau.

U.S. Route 377 passes through the center of the town, leading northeast  to Junction and southwest  to Del Rio. Texas State Highway 55 joins US 377 as Main Street through Rocksprings, but leads northwest  to Sonora and south  to Uvalde.

Climate

The climate in this area is characterized by hot, humid summers and generally mild to cool winters.  According to the Köppen climate classification system, Rocksprings has a humid subtropical climate, Cfa on climate maps.

Economy
The economy of Rocksprings is centered on the wool and mohair industry, and the town is recognized as the Angora goat capital of the world.

Demographics

2020 census

As of the 2020 United States census, there were 874 people, 559 households, and 340 families residing in the town.

2000 census
As of the census of 2000,  1,285 people, 420 households, and 312 families resided in the town. The population density was 1,064.1 people per square mile (410.0/km). The 535 housing units averaged 443.0 per mi2 (170.7/km2). The racial makeup of the town was 76.26% White, 1.17% African American, 0.93% Native American, 0.16% Asian, 18.75% from other races, and 2.72% from two or more races. Hispanics or Latinos of any race were 66.69% of the population.

Of the 420 households, 40.2% had children under the age of 18 living with them, 58.3% were married couples living together, 11.7% had a female householder with no husband present, and 25.5% were not families. About 23.1% of all households were made up of individuals, and 11.9% had someone living alone who was 65 years of age or older. The average household size was 2.99 and the average family size was 3.58.

In the town, the population was distributed as 33.5% under the age of 18, 8.3% from 18 to 24, 25.6% from 25 to 44, 20.5% from 45 to 64, and 12.1% who were 65 years of age or older. The median age was 32 years. For every 100 females, there were 105.3 males. For every 100 females age 18 and over, there were 99.3 males.

Males had a median income of $21,369 versus $14,408 for females. The per capita income for the town was $8,957. About 31.7% of families and 38.2% of the population were below the poverty line, including 51.6% of those under age 18 and 16.8% of those age 65 or over.

Education
The town is served by the Rocksprings Independent School District and home to the Rocksprings High School Angoras. The school mascot is Rocko, the fighting Angora billy.

In Pop Culture

The town of Rocksprings was the location of the Texas State Penitentiary, Spring Valley Unit, in two episodes in season three of the television show Brooklyn Nine-Nine.

Photo gallery

References

Towns in Edwards County, Texas
Towns in Texas
County seats in Texas
Populated places established in 1891
1891 establishments in Texas